The Alejandro Villanueva Stadium, popularly known as Matute, is a soccer stadium located in the Matute neighborhood of the La Victoria district in Lima, Peru. The venue is owned by Club Alianza Lima, and it is here that the club plays at home in the Peruvian Liga 1 and in international tournaments such as the Conmebol Libertadores or the Conmebol Sudamericana.

The stadium was registered as one of the alternate venues of the Peruvian Soccer Team for the South American qualifiers prior to the 2018 FIFA World Cup and was also considered as a possible venue for the Lima 2019 Pan American Games.

Currently, the Blue and Whites Fund, a group of investors managed by the club, is considering development of an ambitious project for the expansion and total modernization of the stadium. This would include the 4 tribunes, playing field, underlying buildings, alternate court, Villa Intima and surroundings of the enclosure. The expansion is expected to provide Alejandro Villanueva with a capacity of 60,000 spectators.

History

On April 11, 1965, it was announced at a press conference by Walter Lavalleja that a stadium was to be built in Lima for the club Alianza Lima. This was made possible by the president at that time, Manuel Odria, who donated a piece of land for the construction of the stadium. On May 30, 1969, the first phase of the project began.

The stadium was inaugurated with the "Señor de Los Milagros" tournament featuring Alianza Lima, city rivals Universitario de Deportes, Nacional of Uruguay, and Independiente of Argentina. The stadium opened on December 27, 1974, to 55,000 spectators with Alianza Lima drawing 2–2 with Nacional.

The stadium has carried the club name since its opening. However, in 2000, with Alianza Lima's centennial anniversary approaching, the club rechristened the stadium name to Estadio Alejandro Villanueva in honor one of one their most important players.

References

Alianza Lima
Sports venues in Lima
Football venues in Lima